David or Dave Cochrane may refer to:

 David Cochrane (footballer) (1910–?), Scottish footballer
 Dave Cochrane (baseball) (born 1963), Major League Baseball utility player
 Dave Cochrane (Canadian Forces officer), Royal Canadian Air Force officer
 Dave Cochrane (musician), English bass guitarist
 David Cochrane (journalist), Canadian journalist